Chenaran County is in Razavi Khorasan province, Iran. The capital of the county is the city of Chenaran, about 45 km west of the city of Mashhad. At the 2006 census, the county's population was 108,533 in 26,937 households. The following census in 2011 counted 125,601 people in 34,477 households. At the 2016 census, the county's population was 155,013 in 45,105 households. Golbajar District was separated from Chenaran County on 17 November 2019 to form Golbahar County.

An agricultural county, Chenaran has been recently developing industries as well, especially in the industrial area of the city to the south. The common sport of the city is wrestling. There are many farms in the outskirts of the city.

Administrative divisions

The population history and structural changes of Chenaran County's administrative divisions over three consecutive censuses are shown in the following table. The latest census shows two districts, five rural districts, and three cities.

References

 

Counties of Razavi Khorasan Province